Ola Patrik Bertil Möller (born 1983) is a Swedish politician and member of the Riksdag, the national legislature. A member of the Social Democratic Party, he has represented Skåne County West since September 2018.

Möller has a degree from Lund University. He has had various jobs including warehouse worker, restaurant assistant, salesperson and teacher.

References

1983 births
Living people
Lund University alumni
Members of the Riksdag 2018–2022
Members of the Riksdag 2022–2026
Members of the Riksdag from the Social Democrats